The 1973 Australian Drivers' Championship was a CAMS sanctioned national motor racing title open to drivers of Australian Formula 1 and Australian Formula 2 cars. It was the seventeenth Australian Drivers' Championship and the championship winner was awarded the 1973 CAMS "Gold Star".

The championship was won by John McCormack driving an Elfin MR5 Repco Holden.

Schedule

The championship was contested over a five-round series with one race per round. There was to be a round at Symmons Plains on 23 September in an event shared with the 1973 Australian Formula 2 Championship. However, as just four Formula 5000 cars were entered, organisers decided to run the event only for Formula Two cars. There was also originally to be an event at Warwick Farm before that facility closed suddenly earlier in 1973. As a result of these cancellations, a second event was added at Phillip Island in late November.

Points system
Championship points were awarded on a 9–6–4–3–2–1 basis for the top six places in each round with all rounds counting towards each driver's points total. Only drivers holding a CAMS General Competition License were eligible to score points.

Results

Note: The Australian Grand Prix was won by New Zealander Graham McRae. However, as the Australian Drivers' Championship was open only to holders of a CAMS General Competition License, 9 points were awarded to the highest placed eligible driver, John McCormack, 6 points to the second highest placed eligible driver etc.

Championship name
Conditions for the championship were promulgated by CAMS under the name "Australian Formula 1 Championship – Gold Star Award", with mention of the requirement for the phrase "Australian Champion Driver" to be reserved exclusively for the winner of the CAMS Gold Star. Historic records published by CAMS use the term Australian Drivers' Championship and that title has been used here.

References

Australian Drivers' Championship
Drivers' Championship
Formula 5000